
Gmina Damasławek is a rural gmina (administrative district) in Wągrowiec County, Greater Poland Voivodeship, in west-central Poland.

Villages
Gmina Damasławek contains the villages and settlements of Dąbrowa, Damasławek, Gruntowice, Kołybki, Kopanina, Kozielsko, Miąża, Międzylesie, Modrzewie, Mokronosy, Niemczyn, Piotrkowice, Rakowo, Smuszewo, Starężyn, Starężynek, Stępuchowo, Turza and Wiśniewko.

Neighbouring gminas
Gmina Damasławek is bordered by the gminas of Gołańcz, Janowiec Wielkopolski, Mieścisko, Wągrowiec, Wapno and Żnin.

References
Polish official population figures 2006

Damaslawek
Wągrowiec County